Jordan Roy Tillson (born 5 March 1993) is an English professional footballer who plays as a defensive midfielder for Ross County.

Early life 

Tillson is the son of former footballer and Exeter City first team coach Andy Tillson.

Playing career

Exeter City 

Tillson made his professional debut for Exeter on 3 May 2014 in a 2–0 victory over Hartlepool at Victoria Park in League Two.

Tillson signed a new contract in May 2014.

On 2 September 2015, Tillson captained Exeter in a 2–0 victory over Portsmouth in the Football League Trophy. On 6 December 2015, Tillson scored the first goal in Exeter's 2–0 victory over Port Vale in the second round proper of the FA Cup. His last appearance for the Grecians came in a 1–0 away win over Forest Green Rovers before his departure 2 weeks later.

Gloucester City 
In August 2012, Tillson joined Gloucester City on an initial one-month loan. His loan was extended by a further month in September.

Chippenham Town 
In February 2013, Tillson, along with Jake Wannell, joined Chippenham Town on a one-month loan. In August 2013, he rejoined the Bluebirds on another one-month loan.

Weston-super-Mare 
In March 2015, Tillson joined Weston-super-Mare on a one-month loan. He made his debut in a 2–1 win over Havant & Waterlooville. Tillson scored an own-goal in the match against Basingstoke Town. He scored his first goal for the Seagulls in a 2–1 defeat to Concord Rangers.

Ross County
Tillson moved to Scottish Premiership club Ross County in January 2020. He made his debut in a 1–0 defeat to Ayr United in the Scottish Cup. On March 8 2022, Tillson signed a new two-year contract extension with County keeping him at the club until 2024.

Career statistics

References

External links 
 Jordan Tillson player profile at Exeter City
 
 

1993 births
Living people
English footballers
Association football defenders
Exeter City F.C. players
Gloucester City A.F.C. players
Chippenham Town F.C. players
Cheltenham Town F.C. players
English Football League players
National League (English football) players
Southern Football League players
Ross County F.C. players
Scottish Professional Football League players